Jonathan Crawford (born 12 March 1990, in Glasgow) is a Scottish professional footballer who plays for Montrose.

Career
Crawford started his career at Aberdeen, where he featured as an unused substitute for two years. In February 2009, Crawford signed a twelve-month contract extension.

He made his first team debut on 22 August 2009, for Aberdeen against Hamilton Academical. However, his time team opportunities and his own injury concerns limited his place.

In January 2010, he went on loan to Peterhead for a month. After making fourteen appearances at Peterhead, it announced that Crawford will be released by the club, citing contract expiration.

On 17 September 2010, he joined Montrose until the end of the season after he impressed
as a trialist.

Towards the end of the 2013–2014 season, Crawford was linked a move to Cove Rangers after the move was agreed. However, the move was broken down for unknown circumstances.

Career statistics

A.  The "Other" column constitutes appearances (including substitutes) and goals in the Scottish Challenge Cup.

External links

References

Aberdeen F.C. players
Scottish footballers
1990 births
Living people
Peterhead F.C. players
Footballers from Glasgow
Association football defenders
Montrose F.C. players
People educated at Uddingston Grammar School